Sanjay Garg is an Indian politician. He belongs to the Samajwadi Party. He is a member of Seventeenth Legislative Assembly of Uttar Pradesh representing the Saharanpur Nagar assembly constituency. Garg is 59 years old (2017) and a graduate. He is seasoned politician who has been active in politics for over 4 decades now. He has successfully made himself recognized by everyone as a simple, dedicated, non-corrupt and futuristic leader, which makes him one of the few most eligible people's representatives in the State.

Political career
Sanjay Garg has been a MLA. He represented the  Saharanpur Nagar constituency 
in 2017 and he is a member of the  Samajwadi Party. In Seventeenth Legislative Assembly of Uttar Pradesh he defeated Bhartiya Janata Party candidate Rajiv Gumber by a margin of 4,636 votes.

Posts held

References 

Uttar Pradesh MLAs 2017–2022
Samajwadi Party politicians from Uttar Pradesh
Living people
Year of birth missing (living people)
Janata Party politicians
Bahujan Samaj Party politicians